The Shadow Secretary of State for Business and Industrial Strategy is an office within British politics held by a member of His Majesty's Most Loyal Opposition. The duty of the office holder is to scrutinise the actions of the government's Secretary of State for Business and Trade and develop alternative policies. The office holder is a member of the Shadow Cabinet. The position is currently held by Jonathan Reynolds.

List of Shadow Secretaries

Shadow Secretary of State for Industry

Shadow Secretary of State for Trade

Official Opposition (United Kingdom)